The City of Coburg was a local government area about  north of Melbourne, the state capital of Victoria, Australia.

History

Initial efforts at local government saw the Sydney Road Trust set up in 1840, which boasted John Fawkner as a founding member, but the first incorporation in the area was the Pentridge District Road Board in 1859, which was renamed Coburg on 21 January 1869, after a Royal visit from Prince Alfred, Duke of Saxe-Coburg and Gotha. It became a shire on 24 December 1874, before increasing urbanisation in the late 19th century led to it being reclassified a borough in January 1905. Coburg then became a town on 18 September 1912, and was proclaimed a city on 29 March 1922.

Between 1947 and 1981, the percentage of overseas-born residents of the City of Coburg increased from 9% to 34%, with significant proportions being of Italian or Greek origins.

On 22 June 1994, the City of Coburg was abolished, and along with the City of Brunswick, was merged into the newly created City of Moreland. A tiny strip on the eastern boundary was transferred to the newly created City of Darebin, which incorporated the Cities of Preston and Northcote.

Council meetings were held at the Coburg City Hall, on Bell Street, Coburg. The hall is still used for this purpose by the City of Moreland.

Wards

The City of Coburg was divided into four wards, each electing three councillors:
 East Ward
 West Ward
 North Ward
 Central Ward

Suburbs
 Coburg*
 Coburg North
 Pascoe Vale (shared with the City of Broadmeadows)
 Pascoe Vale South

* Council seat.

Population

* Estimate in the 1958 Victorian Year Book.

References

External links
 Victorian Places - Coburg and Coburg City

Coburg
City of Merri-bek
1856 establishments in Australia
1994 disestablishments in Australia